In computer science, lexical analysis, lexing or tokenization is the process of converting a sequence of characters (such as in a computer program or web page) into a sequence of lexical tokens (strings with an assigned and thus identified meaning). A program that performs lexical analysis may be termed a lexer, tokenizer, or scanner, although scanner is also a term for the first stage of a lexer. A lexer is generally combined with a parser, which together analyze the syntax of programming languages, web pages, and so forth.

Applications 
A lexer forms the first phase of a compiler frontend in processing. Analysis generally occurs in one pass.

In older languages such as ALGOL, the initial stage was instead line reconstruction, which performed unstropping and removed whitespace and comments (and had scannerless parsers, with no separate lexer). These steps are now done as part of the lexer.

Lexers and parsers are most often used for compilers, but can be used for other computer language tools, such as prettyprinters or linters. Lexing can be divided into two stages: the scanning, which segments the input string into syntactic units called lexemes and categorizes these into token classes; and the evaluating, which converts lexemes into processed values.

Lexers are generally quite simple, with most of the complexity deferred to the parser or semantic analysis phases, and can often be generated by a lexer generator, notably lex or derivatives. However, lexers can sometimes include some complexity, such as phrase structure processing to make input easier and simplify the parser, and may be written partly or fully by hand, either to support more features or for performance.

Lexical analysis is also an important early stage in natural language processing, where text or sound waves are segmented into words and other units. This requires a variety of decisions which are not fully standardized, and the number of tokens systems produce varies for strings like "1/2", "chair's", "can't", "and/or", "1/1/2010", "2x4", "...,", and many others. This is in contrast to lexical analysis for programming and similar languages where exact rules are commonly defined and known.

Lexeme 
A lexeme is a sequence of characters in the source program that matches the pattern for a token and is identified by the lexical analyzer as an instance of that token.

Some authors term this a "token", using "token" interchangeably to represent the string being tokenized, and the token data structure resulting from putting this string through the tokenization process.

The word lexeme in computer science is defined differently than lexeme in linguistics. A lexeme in computer science roughly corresponds to a word in linguistics (not to be confused with a word in computer architecture), although in some cases it may be more similar to a morpheme. In some natural languages (for example, in English), the linguistic lexeme is similar to the lexeme in computer science, but this is generally not true (for example, in Chinese, it is highly non-trivial to find word boundaries due to the lack of word separators).

Token 

A lexical token or simply token is a string with an assigned and thus identified meaning. It is structured as a pair consisting of a token name and an optional token value. The token name is a category of lexical unit. Common token names are
 identifier: names the programmer chooses;
 keyword: names already in the programming language;
 separator (also known as punctuators): punctuation characters and paired-delimiters;
 operator: symbols that operate on arguments and produce results;
 literal: numeric, logical, textual, reference literals;
 comment: line, block (Depends on the compiler if compiler implements comments as tokens otherwise it will be stripped).

Consider this expression in the C programming language:
 

The lexical analysis of this expression yields the following sequence of tokens:
 [(identifier, x), (operator, =), (identifier, a), (operator, +), (identifier, b), (operator, *), (literal, 2), (separator, ;)]

A token name is what might be termed a part of speech in linguistics.

Lexical grammar 

The specification of a programming language often includes a set of rules, the lexical grammar, which defines the lexical syntax. The lexical syntax is usually a regular language, with the grammar rules consisting of regular expressions; they define the set of possible character sequences (lexemes) of a token. A lexer recognizes strings, and for each kind of string found the lexical program takes an action, most simply producing a token.

Two important common lexical categories are white space and comments. These are also defined in the grammar and processed by the lexer, but may be discarded (not producing any tokens) and considered non-significant, at most separating two tokens (as in if x instead of ifx). There are two important exceptions to this. First, in off-side rule languages that delimit blocks with indenting, initial whitespace is significant, as it determines block structure, and is generally handled at the lexer level; see phrase structure, below. Secondly, in some uses of lexers, comments and whitespace must be preserved – for examples, a prettyprinter also needs to output the comments and some debugging tools may provide messages to the programmer showing the original source code. In the 1960s, notably for ALGOL, whitespace and comments were eliminated as part of the line reconstruction phase (the initial phase of the compiler frontend), but this separate phase has been eliminated and these are now handled by the lexer.

Tokenization 

Tokenization is the process of demarcating and possibly classifying sections of a string of input characters. The resulting tokens are then passed on to some other form of processing. The process can be considered a sub-task of parsing input.

For example, in the text string:
 The quick brown fox jumps over the lazy dog

the string isn't implicitly segmented on spaces, as a natural language speaker would do. The raw input, the 43 characters, must be explicitly split into the 9 tokens with a given space delimiter (i.e., matching the string " " or regular expression /\s{1}/).

When a token class represents more than one possible lexeme, the lexer often saves enough information to reproduce the original lexeme, so that it can be used in semantic analysis. The parser typically retrieves this information from the lexer and stores it in the abstract syntax tree. This is necessary in order to avoid information loss in the case where numbers may also be valid identifiers.

Tokens are identified based on the specific rules of the lexer. Some methods used to identify tokens include: regular expressions, specific sequences of characters termed a flag, specific separating characters called delimiters, and explicit definition by a dictionary. Special characters, including punctuation characters, are commonly used by lexers to identify tokens because of their natural use in written and programming languages.

Tokens are often categorized by character content or by context within the data stream. Categories are defined by the rules of the lexer. Categories often involve grammar elements of the language used in the data stream. Programming languages often categorize tokens as identifiers, operators, grouping symbols, or by data type. Written languages commonly categorize tokens as nouns, verbs, adjectives, or punctuation. Categories are used for post-processing of the tokens either by the parser or by other functions in the program.

A lexical analyzer generally does nothing with combinations of tokens, a task left for a parser. For example, a typical lexical analyzer recognizes parentheses as tokens, but does nothing to ensure that each "(" is matched with a ")".

When a lexer feeds tokens to the parser, the representation used is typically an enumerated list of number representations. For example, "Identifier" is represented with 0, "Assignment operator" with 1, "Addition operator" with 2, etc.

Tokens are defined often by regular expressions, which are understood by a lexical analyzer generator such as lex. The lexical analyzer (generated automatically by a tool like lex, or hand-crafted) reads in a stream of characters, identifies the lexemes in the stream, and categorizes them into tokens. This is termed tokenizing. If the lexer finds an invalid token, it will report an error.

Following tokenizing is parsing. From there, the interpreted data may be loaded into data structures for general use, interpretation, or compiling.

Scanner 
The first stage, the scanner, is usually based on a finite-state machine (FSM). It has encoded within it information on the possible sequences of characters that can be contained within any of the tokens it handles (individual instances of these character sequences are termed lexemes). For example, an integer lexeme may contain any sequence of numerical digit characters.  In many cases, the first non-whitespace character can be used to deduce the kind of token that follows and subsequent input characters are then processed one at a time until reaching a character that is not in the set of characters acceptable for that token (this is termed the maximal munch, or longest match, rule). In some languages, the lexeme creation rules are more complex and may involve backtracking over previously read characters. For example, in C, one 'L' character is not enough to distinguish between an identifier that begins with 'L' and a wide-character string literal.

Evaluator 
A lexeme, however, is only a string of characters known to be of a certain kind (e.g., a string literal, a sequence of letters). In order to construct a token, the lexical analyzer needs a second stage, the evaluator, which goes over the characters of the lexeme to produce a value. The lexeme's type combined with its value is what properly constitutes a token, which can be given to a parser. Some tokens such as parentheses do not really have values, and so the evaluator function for these can return nothing: only the type is needed. Similarly, sometimes evaluators can suppress a lexeme entirely, concealing it from the parser, which is useful for whitespace and comments. The evaluators for identifiers are usually simple (literally representing the identifier), but may include some unstropping. The evaluators for integer literals may pass the string on (deferring evaluation to the semantic analysis phase), or may perform evaluation themselves, which can be involved for different bases or floating point numbers. For a simple quoted string literal, the evaluator needs to remove only the quotes, but the evaluator for an escaped string literal incorporates a lexer, which unescapes the escape sequences.

For example, in the source code of a computer program, the string
  
might be converted into the following lexical token stream; whitespace is suppressed and special characters have no value:
 IDENTIFIER net_worth_future
 EQUALS
 OPEN_PARENTHESIS
 IDENTIFIER assets
 MINUS
 IDENTIFIER liabilities
 CLOSE_PARENTHESIS
 SEMICOLON

Due to licensing restrictions of existing parsers, it may be necessary to write a lexer by hand. This is practical if the list of tokens is small, but in general, lexers are generated by automated tools. These tools generally accept regular expressions that describe the tokens allowed in the input stream. Each regular expression is associated with a production rule in the lexical grammar of the programming language that evaluates the lexemes matching the regular expression. These tools may generate source code that can be compiled and executed or construct a state transition table for a finite-state machine (which is plugged into template code for compiling and executing).

Regular expressions compactly represent patterns that the characters in lexemes might follow. For example, for an English-based language, an IDENTIFIER token might be any English alphabetic character or an underscore, followed by any number of instances of ASCII alphanumeric characters and/or underscores. This could be represented compactly by the string . This means "any character a-z, A-Z or _, followed by 0 or more of a-z, A-Z, _ or 0-9".

Regular expressions and the finite-state machines they generate are not powerful enough to handle recursive patterns, such as "n opening parentheses, followed by a statement, followed by n closing parentheses." They are unable to keep count, and verify that n is the same on both sides, unless a finite set of permissible values exists for n. It takes a full parser to recognize such patterns in their full generality. A parser can push parentheses on a stack and then try to pop them off and see if the stack is empty at the end (see example in the Structure and Interpretation of Computer Programs book).

Obstacles 
Typically, tokenization occurs at the word level. However, it is sometimes difficult to define what is meant by a "word". Often a tokenizer relies on simple heuristics, for example:
 Punctuation and whitespace may or may not be included in the resulting list of tokens.
 All contiguous strings of alphabetic characters are part of one token; likewise with numbers.
 Tokens are separated by whitespace characters, such as a space or line break, or by punctuation characters.

In languages that use inter-word spaces (such as most that use the Latin alphabet, and most programming languages), this approach is fairly straightforward. However, even here there are many edge cases such as contractions, hyphenated words, emoticons, and larger constructs such as URIs (which for some purposes may count as single tokens). A classic example is "New York-based", which a naive tokenizer may break at the space even though the better break is (arguably) at the hyphen.

Tokenization is particularly difficult for languages written in scriptio continua which exhibit no word boundaries such as Ancient Greek, Chinese, or Thai. Agglutinative languages, such as Korean, also make tokenization tasks complicated.

Some ways to address the more difficult problems include developing more complex heuristics, querying a table of common special-cases, or fitting the tokens to a language model that identifies collocations in a later processing step.

Lexer generator 

Lexers are often generated by a lexer generator, analogous to parser generators, and such tools often come together. The most established is lex, paired with the yacc parser generator, or rather some of their many reimplementations, like flex (often paired with GNU Bison). These generators are a form of domain-specific language, taking in a lexical specification – generally regular expressions with some markup – and emitting a lexer.

These tools yield very fast development, which is very important in early development, both to get a working lexer and because a language specification may change often. Further, they often provide advanced features, such as pre- and post-conditions which are hard to program by hand. However, an automatically generated lexer may lack flexibility, and thus may require some manual modification, or an all-manually written lexer.

Lexer performance is a concern, and optimizing is worthwhile, more so in stable languages where the lexer is run very often (such as C or HTML). lex/flex-generated lexers are reasonably fast, but improvements of two to three times are possible using more tuned generators. Hand-written lexers are sometimes used, but modern lexer generators produce faster lexers than most hand-coded ones. The lex/flex family of generators uses a table-driven approach which is much less efficient than the directly coded approach. With the latter approach the generator produces an engine that directly jumps to follow-up states via goto statements. Tools like re2c have proven to produce engines that are between two and three times faster than flex produced engines. It is in general difficult to hand-write analyzers that perform better than engines generated by these latter tools.

Phrase structure 
Lexical analysis mainly segments the input stream of characters into tokens, simply grouping the characters into pieces and categorizing them. However, the lexing may be significantly more complex; most simply, lexers may omit tokens or insert added tokens. Omitting tokens, notably whitespace and comments, is very common, when these are not needed by the compiler. Less commonly, added tokens may be inserted. This is done mainly to group tokens into statements, or statements into blocks, to simplify the parser.

Line continuation 
Line continuation is a feature of some languages where a newline is normally a statement terminator. Most often, ending a line with a backslash (immediately followed by a newline) results in the line being continued – the following line is joined to the prior line. This is generally done in the lexer: the backslash and newline are discarded, rather than the newline being tokenized. Examples include bash, other shell scripts and Python.

Semicolon insertion 
Many languages use the semicolon as a statement terminator. Most often this is mandatory, but in some languages the semicolon is optional in many contexts. This is mainly done at the lexer level, where the lexer outputs a semicolon into the token stream, despite one not being present in the input character stream, and is termed semicolon insertion or automatic semicolon insertion. In these cases, semicolons are part of the formal phrase grammar of the language, but may not be found in input text, as they can be inserted by the lexer. Optional semicolons or other terminators or separators are also sometimes handled at the parser level, notably in the case of trailing commas or semicolons.

Semicolon insertion is a feature of BCPL and its distant descendant Go, though it is absent in B or C. Semicolon insertion is present in JavaScript, though the rules are somewhat complex and much-criticized; to avoid bugs, some recommend always using semicolons, while others use initial semicolons, termed defensive semicolons, at the start of potentially ambiguous statements.

Semicolon insertion (in languages with semicolon-terminated statements) and line continuation (in languages with newline-terminated statements) can be seen as complementary: semicolon insertion adds a token, even though newlines generally do not generate tokens, while line continuation prevents a token from being generated, even though newlines generally do generate tokens.

Off-side rule 

The off-side rule (blocks determined by indenting) can be implemented in the lexer, as in Python, where increasing the indenting results in the lexer emitting an INDENT token, and decreasing the indenting results in the lexer emitting a DEDENT token. These tokens correspond to the opening brace { and closing brace } in languages that use braces for blocks, and means that the phrase grammar does not depend on whether braces or indenting are used. This requires that the lexer hold state, namely the current indent level, and thus can detect changes in indenting when this changes, and thus the lexical grammar is not context-free: INDENT–DEDENT depend on the contextual information of prior indent level.

Context-sensitive lexing 
Generally lexical grammars are context-free, or almost so, and thus require no looking back or ahead, or backtracking, which allows a simple, clean, and efficient implementation. This also allows simple one-way communication from lexer to parser, without needing any information flowing back to the lexer.

There are exceptions, however. Simple examples include: semicolon insertion in Go, which requires looking back one token; concatenation of consecutive string literals in Python, which requires holding one token in a buffer before emitting it (to see if the next token is another string literal); and the off-side rule in Python, which requires maintaining a count of indent level (indeed, a stack of each indent level). These examples all only require lexical context, and while they complicate a lexer somewhat, they are invisible to the parser and later phases.

A more complex example is the lexer hack in C, where the token class of a sequence of characters cannot be determined until the semantic analysis phase, since typedef names and variable names are lexically identical but constitute different token classes. Thus in the hack, the lexer calls the semantic analyzer (say, symbol table) and checks if the sequence requires a typedef name. In this case, information must flow back not from the parser only, but from the semantic analyzer back to the lexer, which complicates design.

See also 
 List of parser generators

References

Sources 

 Compiling with C# and Java, Pat Terry, 2005, 
 Algorithms + Data Structures = Programs, Niklaus Wirth, 1975, 
 Compiler Construction, Niklaus Wirth, 1996, 
 Sebesta, R. W. (2006). Concepts of programming languages (Seventh edition) pp. 177. Boston: Pearson/Addison-Wesley.

External links 
 
 
 Word Mention Segmentation Task, an analysis

 
Compiler construction
Programming language implementation
Parsing